The Prudential Regulation Authority (PRA) is a United Kingdom financial services regulatory body, formed as one of the successors to the Financial Services Authority (FSA). The authority is responsible for the prudential regulation and supervision of banks, building societies, credit unions, insurers and major investment firms. It sets standards and supervises financial institutions at the level of the individual firm. Although it was initially structured as a limited company wholly owned by the Bank of England, the PRA's functions have now been taken over by the Bank and are exercised through the Prudential Regulation Committee. The company has since been liquidated.

The PRA was created by the Financial Services Act 2012 and formally began operating alongside the new Financial Conduct Authority on 1 April 2013. As the Bank of England is operationally independent of the Government of the United Kingdom, the PRA is a quasi-governmental regulator, rather than an arm of the government per se. The PRA has its main offices at 20 Moorgate, near the Bank of England's central offices on Threadneedle Street.

Role
The PRA's role is defined in terms of two statutory objectives: to promote the safety and soundness of the firms it regulates and, specifically for insurers, to contribute to the securing of an appropriate degree of protection for policyholders (section 12 of the PRA Statement of Policy). In promoting safety and soundness, the PRA focuses primarily on the harm that firms can cause to the stability of the UK financial system. A stable financial system is one in which firms continue to provide critical financial services – a precondition for a healthy and successful economy.

It will have close working relationships with other parts of the Bank, including the Financial Policy Committee and the Special Resolution Unit. The PRA's most significant supervisory decisions are taken by the Prudential Regulation Committee – comprising the Governor of the Bank of England, the Deputy Governor for Financial Stability, the Deputy Governor for Monetary Policy, the Deputy Governor for Markets & Banking, the chief executive officer of the PRA (and Deputy Governor for Prudential Regulation) and independent non-executive members.

The PRA's approach to regulation and supervision has three characteristics:
 A judgement-based approach: The PRA will use judgement in determining whether financial firms are safe and sound, whether insurers provide appropriate protection for policyholders and whether firms continue to meet the threshold conditions.
 A forward-looking approach: The PRA will assess firms not just against current risks, but also against those that could plausibly arise in the future. Where the PRA judges it necessary to intervene, it will generally aim to do so at an early stage.
 A focused approach: The PRA will focus on those issues and those firms that pose the greatest risk to the stability of the UK financial system and policyholders.

The PRA approach to supervision will not seek to operate a "zero-failure" regime. Rather, the PRA will seek to ensure that a financial firm which fails does so in a way that avoids significant disruption to the supply of critical financial services.

List of chief executives
The chief executive of the PRA is also the Bank of England Deputy Governor for Prudential Regulation. The following is a list of chief executives since the PRA's inception:

History 
From 1 April 2013, the Prudential Regulatory Authority, alongside the Financial Conduct Authority, replaced the Financial Services Authority.

In response to the onset of the COVID-19 pandemic in the United Kingdom in March 2020, the PRA sent a formal request to the seven largest British lenders to suspend dividends and share repurchases until the end of the year.

References

External links

Bank of England
HM Treasury
Financial services companies established in 2013
Financial regulatory authorities of the United Kingdom
2013 establishments in the United Kingdom
Government agencies established in 2013
Securities and exchange commissions
Bank regulation